Edward Bernard Smith (July 5, 1929 – November 26, 1998) was an NBA basketball player for the New York Knicks. He was drafted with the sixth pick in the first round of the 1951 NBA Draft by the Knicks. He made his NBA debut in the 1953–54 NBA season and played in eleven games where he averaged 2.5 points per game and 2.4 rebounds per game.

References

1929 births
1998 deaths
American men's basketball players
Basketball players from Ohio
Harvard Crimson men's basketball players
New York Knicks draft picks
New York Knicks players
People from West Jefferson, Ohio
Small forwards